Warnow may refer to:

 Warnow, a river in Mecklenburg-Vorpommern, Germany
 Warnow (Güstrow), a municipality in the district of Güstrow, Mecklenburg-Vorpommern, Germany
 Warnow, Pommern, German name of Warnowo, West Pomeranian Voivodeship, modern Poland
 Warnow, Nordwestmecklenburg, a municipality in the district Nordwestmecklenburg, Mecklenburg-Vorpommern, Germany
 , a German merchant ship requisitioned by the Kriegsmarine during the Second World War
 Harry Warnow (1908–1994), birth name of Raymond Scott, American composer, band leader, pianist, record producer, and inventor of electronic instruments
 Mark Warnow (1900–1949), American big band leader and violinist
 Tandy Warnow, American computer scientist